Route 96 may refer to:

Melbourne tram route 96, Australia
OC Transpo Route 96, a bus rapid transit route in Ottawa, Ontario, Canada
Winnipeg Route 96, Canada
Route 96 (Iceland)
London Buses route 96, UK

In the U.S.:
U.S. Route 96
U.S. Route 96 (1926)
Alabama State Route 96
Arizona State Route 96
California State Route 96
Georgia State Route 96
Illinois Route 96
Kentucky Route 96
Maine State Route 96
Maryland Route 96 (former)
Massachusetts Route 96
Missouri Route 96
New York State Route 96
Ohio State Route 96
Pennsylvania Route 96
Rhode Island Route 96
Tennessee State Route 96
Utah State Route 96
Virginia State Route 96
Washington State Route 96

See also
List of highways numbered 96

96